Tiruppuvanam block is a revenue block in the Sivaganga district of Tamil Nadu, India. It has a total of 45 panchayat villages.

References 
 

Revenue blocks of Sivaganga district